is a passenger railway station located in the town of Kyōtamba, Funai District, Kyoto Prefecture, Japan, operated by West Japan Railway Company (JR West).

Lines

Station layout
The station consists of two opposed ground-level side platforms connected to the station building by a footbridge. The station is unattended.

Platforms

History
Shimoyama Station opened on October 10, 1925. With the privatization of the Japan National Railways (JNR) on April 1, 1987, the station came under the aegis of the West Japan Railway Company.

Passenger statistics
In fiscal 2016, the station was used by an average of 206 passengers daily.

Surrounding area
 Kyotanba Town Shimoyama Elementary School
 Kyoto Prefectural Tamba Nature Sports Park

See also
List of railway stations in Japan

External links

 Station Official Site

Railway stations in Kyoto Prefecture
Sanin Main Line
Railway stations in Japan opened in 1925
Kyōtamba, Kyoto